Lake Vallüla (German Vallülasee) is a mountain lake located in Montafon, Austria. This secluded area on Mount Vallüla can only be reached on foot due to its high elevation and rough terrain. The climb takes approximately 5 hours.

The mountain lake possesses clear, chilly drinking water. The Vallülabach (length: ~ 5 km) feeds and drains the lake and merges with the river Ill. Fishes such as trout  can be found in the water.

Lakes of Vorarlberg
LVallulasee
Silvretta Alps